Inter is a Ukrainian television channel. It covers 99.7 percent of Ukraine's territory. According to Kyiv Post it is among the most-watched television channels in Ukraine.

Inter features a general programming mix appealing to both young and old audience, includes movies, music, drama, documentaries, news, kids' programs etc.

In between of 2014 and 2016 the channel was heavily criticized by pro-western political activists and accused of spreading pro-Russian propaganda and advancing Russian political agenda in context of ongoing Russo-Ukrainian War at the time.

History
The channel was founded by the Ukrainian Independent TV-Corporation in 1996.

Besides its international version of the channel as the business project, Inter now consists of several similar projects. Those are 07 Production - a studio of the documentary films, NIS - an information studio featuring Podrobytsi, Pirat Production - a studio of the entertaining shows.

There are also over five other independent channels such as NTN, K1, K2, Megasport, Enter-Film, and Enter-Music (a Ukrainian version of MTV).

On September 15, 2016, Kateryna Shkuratova was appointed Chairperson of the Board of Inter TV channel.

Inter Plus

Inter Plus is the international network of Inter Channel that broadcasts the 'best of Inter' programming to Ukrainians abroad in North America & Europe. The channel first started broadcasting on January 13, 2003, available via Dish Network in the United States and in Germany through Kabel Deutschland and encrypted in Europe & Russia on Sirius 2 & ABS 1 satellites.  As of March 30, 2011, Inter Plus is no longer available on Dish Network.

Inter+ is also available in Canada via IMB+ Records, an IPTV provider.

Programming
 Ahenty Vplyvu (Agents of Influence)
 Kartata Potata
 Kliuchovy Moment (Key Moment) - a talk show led by Nataliya Sumska. The show is oriented to help people to find each other, or to restore long-forgotten relationships, or simply let one of the guests tell a story of their life that they would wish to change.
 Kvadratny metr (Square meter)
 Lehendy Bandytskoi Odesy (Legends of Criminal Odessa) - a historical show that was discontinued in 2009. The show narrated criminal stories of the Odessa city at the times known in history as Russian Civil War and afterwards.
 Liniya Konfliktu (Line of Conflict) - a talk show of Masha Yefrosinina. It is a thrilling socially-psychological project. The show brings up the hottest topics of the everyday's life. The participants of the discussions are bright, inordinary, and confident in the correctness of their views characters. The main task of Masha in the project is to tilt the guests to the sharp debate, literally to the edge of a scandal. At the Line of Conflict will be laid the line of fire!
 Na Svoyu Holovu (On Your Head) - a real-life, adventure-oriented game-show led by Ihor Pelykh.
 Nayrozumnishy (Smartest) - an intellectual game-show with a lightning-fast diction anchor-lady, Tina Kandelaki.
 Novatsii i Shtukentsii (Inventions and Stuff)
 Park Avtomobilnoho Periodu (Park of the Automobile Era)
 Podrobytsi (Details)
 Podrobytsi Tyzhnia (Details Weekly)
 Pozaochi (Pass the Eyes) - a talk show with celebrities. The authors of the show are Hanna Bezliudna and Irina Ionova. The show is led by Yulia Lytvynenko. The goal of the show is to let the audience to get to know their favorite characters a little bit closer.
 Ranok z Interom (Morning with Inter)
 Sudovi Spravy (Court Affairs)
 Svoboda na Interi (Freedom on Inter)
 Vechirniy Kvartal (Evening Neighborhood)
 Vidverto pro Futbol (Sincerely about the Soccer)
 Znak yakosti (Sign of Quality)

Personalities 
 Andriy Danilevych (Podrobytsi Tyzhnia)
 Hanna Homonai (Novyny)
 Volodymyr Horiansky (Ranok z Interom)
 Yevhen Koshovy (Vechirniy Kvartal)
 Olha Kotlytska (Na Pershy Pohliad)
 Olena Kravets (Vechirniy Kvartal)
 Yulia Lytvynenko (Pozaochi)
 Dasha Malakhova  (Kartata Potata)
 Ihor Pelykh (Na Svoyu Holovu) (died in a car crash May 8, 2009)
 Ruslan Senichkin (Podrobytsi)
 Nataliya Sumska (Kliuchovy Moment)
 Olha Sumska (Ranok z Interom)
 Masha Yefrosinina (Liniya Konfliktu)
 Iryna Yusupova (Podrobytsi)
 Anastasia Zavorotniuk (Kukhnia dlia Chaynykiv)
 Volodymyr Zelensky (Vechirniy Kvartal)
 Yevgeny Kiselyov (in charge of the news production)

Ownership
The channel was founded by the Ukrainian Independent TV-Corporation in 1996. The Ukrainian independent TV-corporation's shareholders were Dilovyi Svit 51%,  Russian Channel One 29%, Pegas Television 20%. About 82.5% of Pegas Television was the personal property of Ihor Pluzhnikov. The other shares of the company were split between Pegas and Overseas sales Ltd. 17.3% and Bersted Ukraina .2%. Those two companies were his property as well. Besides Pegas he had some share in the Dilovyi Svit which consisted of Bersted Ukraina, RIF-Service, Play Enterprise, insurance company Sindek, and legal services of Konnov and Sozanovskyi. In 2005 Ihor Pluzhnikov unexpectedly died in a hospital. His death caused a lot of discussions on the political level. In August all of the shares Dilovyi Svit and half of Pegas Television (total of 61%) became a property of what later became known as Ukrainian Mediaproject headed by Valeriy Khoroshkovsky. Pegas was taken over by Pluzhnikov's wife, Svitlana, who has 10% ownership of the Ukrainian independent TV-corporation. There is speculation that she does not have any influence on the business of the telechannel, Inter. As of December 2012 61% of the shares are owned by Ukrainian Mediaproject, 29% by Channel One and 10% by Pluzhnikov's widow. According to Yaroslav Porokhniak, head of the management board of Inter, the Russian shareholders have no say in the channel's editorial or programming policies.

In September Valeriy became the head of the Observing Council and in 2006 made some changes in the management. In 2007 on the base of Ukrainian Mediaproject was established U.A. Inter Media Group financial holdings. 
General producers
 Oleksandr Zinchenko (20 October 1996 – 27 May 2002)
 Vladyslav Riashyn (20 October 1996 – 15 January 2006)
 Leonid Mazor (24 March-31 December 2006)
 Hanna Bezliudna (1 January 2007 – 6 September 2009)

Information service managers
 Hanna Bezliudna 1997-2001
 Oleksiy Mustafin 2001-2005
 Maksym Karyzhskyi 2006
 Anton Nikitin 2006-2009
 Oleksandr Pylypets 2009

The channel is part of GDF Media Limited; since Dmytro Firtash bought 100 percent of Inter Media Group Limited (back) from Valeriy Khoroshkovskyi on 1 February 2013. In June 2007 Khoroshkovskyi had expanded his U.A. Inter Media Group Ltd with various other channels bought from Firtash.

GDF Media Limited also owns NTN, K1, Mega, Enter-Film, K2, Pixel and Zoom.

Clock 
Clock is shown before information programs to indicate the beginning and the end of air, and before and after preventive prevention. From October 20, 1996 to October 19, 2000 the clock was silent.

 From October 20, 1996 to October 19, 2000 on a black background show the watch with a green dial, white numbers, white lettering ІНТЕР, white hour and minute hands, red second hand. The clock was silent.
 From 20 October 2000 to 23 August 2007 on a blue background in the lower left corner shows the blue cubes in the center on a white strip running news line (in the morning and in the afternoon in the Ukrainian language, in the evening - in Russian), below there were sites www. inter.ua and www.podrobnosti.ua on the gray bar, even lower on a white strip - electronic time. In the evening, there was podrobnosti.ua site on the right.
 From 24 August 2007 to 30 June 2013 a clock in the earth-TV format was shown, against cities in the world above shows a city, country information, current time, the weather in the city, the word "ПРЯМЕ ВКЛЮЧЕННЯ" at the bottom of the inscription "В КІЄВІ" and electronic time.
 From 6 September 2010 to 30 June 2013 on the background of Ukrainian cities at the top was shown the information about the city, the word "ПРЯМЕ ВКЛЮЧЕННЯ", in the bottom right corner the electronic time.
 From July 1 to August 25, 2013 on a blue background in the center was shown up the globe, "signals" in the center of a three-dimensional ball, white dial, hands also white.
 Since August 26, 2013 to the present time, against the backdrop of a cloudy sky is shown an electronic time on the windows of a skyscraper.

Controversies 
According to critics the channel used to be directly controlled by the Social Democratic Party of Ukraine (united) until the 2004 Orange Revolution.

In January 2009 (former) Ukrainian Prime Minister Yulia Tymoshenko refused to appear on Inter television programs criticizing the channel's associates of their professional ethics.

On 21 February 2014, 16 journalists of the channel claimed to have been the victim of censorship (in the form of having been forced to make "pro-government propaganda") and called on the higher management to objectively cover events concerning Euromaidan. On 22 February 2014 the channel normal programming was replaced, amid rumours of a possible attack or arson on its headquarters, by live broadcast of Parliamentary sessions. On 22 February 2014, as a part of the "Maidan revolution", President Viktor Yanukovych (the one the 16 journalist had complained about being forced to make propaganda for) was removed from office.

Early September 2016 the Inter studios were attacked and then blockaded for three days by St Mary's battalion who accused it of being to pro-Russian amidst of the Russo-Ukrainian War.

Criticism 
In 2014 "Inter" the TV channel informational policy repeatedly caused negative reaction of society. There even was created a Facebook group Blacklist Inter. Also Euromaidan activists have called for boycott of this TV channel and asked its employees not to lie in air. Censorship on "Inter" was reported earlier.

Russian and Russian-language broadcasting content 

Since 2014 "Inter" was criticized for the broadcasting of Russian serials. According to results of monitoring made by "Boycott Russian cinema" activists, in September "Inter" took 3rd place among top-10 nationwide TV-channels which demonstrate Russian films and serials. During the period from 8th to 14 September Russian content lasted in average 11 hours and 15 minutes per day. According to monitoring data of 27 September Russian content took already 67% on this channel.

On December 11, 2014 "Boycott Russian Films" activists were picketing "Inter" main office in Kyiv. During the action named "Do not kill our protectors by Russian propaganda!" young people placed photos of Ukrainian soldiers, killed during the 2014 Russian military intervention in Ukraine, on the main entrance. Activists claimed that "Inter" takes second place among TV channels concerning the amount of Russian origin content. Protesters announced that Russian films and serials on "Inter" glorify Russian armed forces, which is unacceptable during the war.

According to monitoring results held from 1 to 7 December the amount of Russian origin content has increased up to 13 hours and 15 minutes per day.

Scandal on New Year's night TV shows 
From December 31, 2014 to January 1, 2015 during celebration of the New Year this channel broadcast New Year show "Wait for me in the New Year" with Russian stars who have supported occupation of Crimea by Russia (Joseph Kobzon, Oleg Gazmanov, Valeriya, etc.). This event immediately caused a burst of resentment in Ukrainian blogosphere and social network. On January 1, a number of Ukrainian high-ranked officials, politicians and cultural workers reacted. Particularly, the secretary of the National Security and Defense Council of Ukraine Oleksandr Turchynov announced that National Council of Television and Radio of Ukraine must consider about cancellation of channel's licence immediately. In the evening the news program of the channel "Podrobnosti" publicly dissociated from New Year shows with Russian stars participating, and announced that the timetable of TV programs was changed incorrectly.

Member of expert commission on distributing and showing films Serhiy Osnach claims that "Inter" violates regulation about compulsory 50% of Ukrainian content (article 9 of Law Of Ukraine "About television and radiobroadcasting"). From December 5 to 11, 2015 activists of "Boycott Russian Films" campaign have made a monitoring, results of which confirmed what expert said. Activists calculated that there is 17% of Ukrainian content on "Inter".

On January 15, 2015 National Council for Radio and Television of Ukraine gave a warning to "Inter" for program broadcasting.

In January 2015 "Kyivstar" company cancelled its advertisement movies on "Inter": "We stopped placing advertisement movies on "Inter". It is important for us that our advertisement correspond with patriotic values, which "Kyivstar" puts in advertisement as a national Ukrainian operator."

See also
 List of Ukrainian language television channels
 Channel One (Russia)

Notes

References

External links
 Інтер 
 Інтер+ 
 Megasport 

 
Television stations in Ukraine
Television channels and stations established in 1996
Ukrainian brands
Ukrainian-language television stations in Ukraine
Russian-language television stations in Ukraine
1996 establishments in Ukraine